Jackson is a 2008 American comedy-drama-musical film written and directed by J. F. Lawton and starring Barry Primus and Charlie Robinson.

Synopsis
Jackson is about two homeless men in Los Angeles, Donald and Sam. At the start of the day Donald is given a $20 bill (also known as a "Jackson"). The film follows the two and shows their adventures throughout the day with this money, and features songs from various operas.

Cast
 Barry Primus as Donald
 Charlie Robinson as Sam
 Steve Guttenberg as Businessman
 Debra Jo Rupp as Nice Lady

Musical numbers
 "Una furtiva lagrima" from Donizetti's Elixer of Love – Richard Brown and Shawnette Sulker
 "Champagne Aria" from Mozart's Don Giovanni – Cedric Trenton Berry
 "Habanera" from Bizet's Carmen – Elaa Lee Romani/ Chorus: Ariella Vaccarino, Aleta Braxton, Pilar Diaz, Tahlia McCollum
 Sextet from Donizetti's Lucia di Lammermoor – Jennifer Suess, William Gorton, Michael Sokol, Fred Winthrop, Benjamin Von Atrops, Leberta Clark; Music performed by Remy Zero
 Monologue by Ibn Hakia from Tchaikovsky's Iolanta – John R. Jackson
 "O mio babbino caro" from Puccini's Gianni Schicchi – Gustavo Hernandez Jr.
 "Va, pensiero" from Verdi's Nabucco – Socialists: Clamma Dale, Kimarie Torre, Lauren LeeChorus: Laura Decher, Frances Garcia, Erin Neff, Sara MacBride, Gregory Stapp, Antoine Garth, Gary Murphy, Tom Oberjat, Raphaela Rose Primus
 "Love Cannot Be" (written by J.F. Lawton)
 "El Pueblo" – George Lawton and John Cross
 "Vamos a la Fiesta" – Julie Griffin
 "Abrabo" – Way Depp, Robidebs Okyeame, Paa Dogo and Brekete
 "I Wish I Was in Dixie Land" – John B.J. Smith
 "Downtown Birthday" (written by J.F. Lawton)

Production details
Jackson was filmed mainly in Los Angeles with the exception of one scene shot in Kentucky.

Awards
2009 Swansea Bay Film Festival
Best in Festival
2009 The Conscious Life Film Festival
Indigo Award
2009 Treasure Coast International Film Festival
Best Feature Film
Best Editing
 2008 International Film Festival of South Africa
 Best Feature Film
 2008 Non Violent Film Festival
 Best Feature Film
 2008 Lakedance Film Festival
 Audience Award for Best Feature Film
 2008 Socal Film Festival
 Best Feature Film
 Best Director
 Best Actor: Barry Primus

References

External links
 
 

2008 films
2000s musical comedy-drama films
American musical comedy-drama films
2008 comedy films
2008 drama films
2000s English-language films
2000s American films